The United Arab Emirates cricket team toured the Netherlands in July 2017 to play three List A matches. In the opening match, brothers Asad and Saqib Zulfiqar made their debuts and played alongside their other brother, Sikander Zulfiqar. It was the first time triplets had played in a professional cricket team together. The United Arab Emirates won the series 2–1.

Squads

Fixtures

1st match

2nd match

3rd match

References

External links
 Series home at ESPN Cricinfo

2017 in Dutch cricket
2017 in Emirati cricket
International cricket competitions in 2017
Emirati cricket tours abroad
International cricket tours of the Netherlands